Max Bemis and the Painful Splits is a side project created by Say Anything's lead singer Max Bemis in September 2010. He has recorded six albums, titled "Max Bemis and the Painful Splits", "Max Bemis and the Painful Splits 2", "The Painful Splits Destroy", "The Painful Splits Are Multiplying", "Max Bemis and The Painful Splits Stripped Down", and "The Painful Splits Wins", respectively.

Not a solo project
Bemis himself denied that this was an official "solo project", called it a "low-key sort of release", and expected the first CD to be the first of a series of such projects under varying band names.

Discography

Max Bemis and the Painful Splits
1. Chlorine Bath
2. Assimilate All Bastards
3. Do The Dohnk
4. Former Punisher Gone Rogue
5. Ms. Martin
6. Piss on the Precedent
7. Little Star
8. Waster
9. Neodouche
10. Our Sentence is Up

Max Bemis and the Painful Splits 2
1. I Never Knew You Were So Lonely
2. Joshua Adam Sultan
3. Caught By Shifra
4. Fablebound
5. Lowman
6. You're My Nativity
7. Stand Inside Your Love (The Smashing Pumpkins cover)
8. Hey! Do You Not See Me?!
9. Give A Damn
10. Monolo

The Painful Splits Destroy
1. Headrush
2. Bleeding Bat
3. Blythe
4. Floored
5. Troll
6. Like Their Mom
7. Starve
8. Sad Apple
9. Belig
10. Only One Of Us

The Painful Splits Are Multiplying
1. You're Going To Die
2. Use Me Up
3. Gorgeous
4. Sym-Phony
5. Keys
6. There's No Need To Whisper
7. So Far
8. The Worse
9. I'll Prove It
10. You Have Permission To Leave

Max Bemis and The Painful Splits play "...is a Real Boy" ACOUSTIC

1. Belt
2. Woe
3. The Writhing South
4. Alive with the Glory of Love
5. Yellow Cat (Slash) Red Cat
6. The Futile
7. Spidersong
8. An Orgy of Critics
9. Every Man Has a Molly
10. Slowly, Through a Vector
11. Chia-Like, I Shall Grow
12. I Want to Know Your Plans
13. Admit It!!!

Max Bemis and The Painful Splits Stripped Down
1. Come On, It's True
2. The Gap
3. The Best Night
4. Last
5. I Need You
6. I Stopped Believing In You a Long Time Ago
7. In Your Eyes
8. Until You
9. Like Frank Would
10. Clawing at My Skin

The Painful Splits Wins
Unsure of the songs*, it's one long song with multiple songs recorded though.

References

American rock music groups
Musical groups established in 2010
2010 establishments in the United States